Ziziphora capitata is an annual herb in the family Lamiaceae. It grows from the Mediterranean basin to Iran including the Sinai, Palestine / Israel, Lebanon, Syria, Turkey, Cyprus, Balkans, southern Russia, Caucasus, and northern Iraq.

Description
Ziziphora capitata grows from 3 to 12 cm high with simple or branched stems. The aromatic leaves are covered with fine hairs. The lower leaves are from 1 to 2.5 cm long and 0.5 to 0.8 cm wide, linear-lanceolate to elliptic blades and the upper floral leaves are rhombic-ovate. The flowers are tubular, with violet, purple or pink corolla. Flowers are arranged in a globose terminal head, subtended by rhombic-ovate bracts.

Subspecies and varieties 
Ziziphora capitata  var. capitata
Ziziphora capitata  var. alba
Ziziphora capitata subsp. orientalis

References

Further reading
Walter Erhardt, Erich Götz, Nils Bödeker, Siegmund Seybold: Der große Zander. Eugen Ulmer KG, Stuttgart 2008, . (Ger.)
Christoper Brickell (Editor-in-chief): RHS A-Z Encyclopedia of Garden Plants. Third edition. Dorling Kindersley, London 2003, .

capitata
Flora of Europe
Flora of Western Asia
Plants described in 1753
Taxa named by Carl Linnaeus